Unitary theory may refer to:

Physics
 Unitarity (physics), a restriction on any theory in physics that all probabilities must sum to one
 Unitary gauge, a particular choice of a gauge fixing in a gauge theory with a spontaneous symmetry breaking

Other uses
 Unitary executive theory, the theory of US constitutional law holding that the President has the power to control the entire executive branch
 Unitary theories of memory, hypotheses regarding short-term and long-term memory